Yostus Ruhindi (or Yostasi; 1925–2006)  was an Anglican bishop in Uganda.

Ruhindi was born in Rukungiri District and educated at Uganda Christian University. He was ordained deacon in 1957 and priest in 1960. He served in the Diocese of Uganda from 1957 to 1960 and in Namirembe from 1960 to 1972. Ruhindi was consecrated a bishop on 6 August 1972 to serve as Bishop of Bunyoro-Kitara; and after Translation to North Kigezi on 12 April 1981 served until 1996.

References

20th-century Anglican bishops in Uganda
Anglican bishops of North Kigezi
Anglican bishops of Bunyoro-Kitara
1925 births
Uganda Christian University alumni
2006 deaths
People from Rukungiri District